Roman Viktorovich Ptitsyn (born 8 September 1975) is a Russian politician.

Political career 
He was a United Russia candidate in the 2021 Russian legislative election. He was elected to the State Duma in the Altai constituency with 31.99 percent of the vote.

References 

1975 births
Living people
People from the Altai Republic
United Russia politicians
Eighth convocation members of the State Duma (Russian Federation)